Austin Hall may refer to:

People
Austin Hall (writer) (1885–1933), science fiction, fantasy and western writer

Buildings

United States

Building 800–Austin Hall, Montgomery, Alabama
Austin Town Hall, Chicago, Illinois
Austin Hall (Harvard University), Cambridge, Massachusetts
Austin City Hall (Austin, Nevada)
Austin Masonic and Odd Fellows Hall, Austin, Nevada
Austin Scott Hall (Rutgers), New Brunswick, New Jersey
Austin Hall (Delaware, Ohio)
Austin Hall (Oregon State University), Corvallis, Oregon
Austin City Hall (Austin, Texas)
Austin Hall (Huntsville, Texas), listed on the National Register of Historic Places

Architectural disambiguation pages